Kyphosus sandwicensis, commonly called grey chub, Pacific chub or nenue in Hawaiʻi, is found throughout the central Pacific and Hawaiʻi.

References

sandwicensis
Fish of Hawaii
Fish of the Pacific Ocean
Taxa named by Henri Émile Sauvage
Fish described in 1880